Bedburn Beck is a  long, upper tributary of the River Wear in County Durham, England.

Course
Its headwaters rise on the high ground of Woodland Fell, where it is known as the Spurlswood Beck which flows in an easterly direction through a rocky gill of the same name. It then enters Hamsterley Forest, where it is joined by the Euden Beck and becomes known as the Bedburn Beck.

Passing beside the hamlet of Redford before being joined by the Ayhope or South Grain Beck, it then reaches the village of Bedburn where it is bridged by a minor road. Beyond the village it meets the Harthorpe Beck, before descending into the Wear valley between  
Hamsterley and Witton-le-Wear.

Hydrology
The flow of the beck has been measured at a gauging station in its lower reaches at Bedburn since 1959.

Land use within the basin is rural, consisting of moorland, grassland and the coniferous Hamsterley Forest.

See also
List of rivers of England

References

External links

Bedburn Beck water levelsl

Rivers of County Durham